The 1928 All-Ireland Senior Football Championship Final was the 41st All-Ireland Final and the deciding match of the 1928 All-Ireland Senior Football Championship, an inter-county Gaelic football tournament for the top teams in Ireland. 

Cavan claimed that Paddy Loughlin's late goal was thrown into the net. Patsy Devlin hit a goal back to equalise, but Bill Mangan scored a point to win the Sam Maguire Cup for the first time. The match was referred by Thomas Burke.

1928 was the first year in which the Sam Maguire Cup was awarded to the All-Ireland football winner; the cup is still awarded to the winning team.

References

All-Ireland Senior Football Championship Final
All-Ireland Senior Football Championship Final, 1928
All-Ireland Senior Football Championship Finals
Cavan county football team matches
Kildare county football team matches